One ship and one shore establishment of the Royal Navy have borne the name HMS Mauritius, in reference to the former colony of Mauritius:

 was a  light cruiser launched in 1939 and scrapped in 1965.
 was a radio station in Mauritius, commissioned in 1962. It ceased to operate in 1975 and was paid off in 1976.

Royal Navy ship names